John Oliver Rymer (13 August 1924 – 7 April 2003) was the Dean of Auckland from 1970 until 1991.

Rymer was educated at the University of Queensland ordained in 1948. His first posts were curacies at St Peter's Cathedral Armidale and St Paul's Cathedral, Rockhampton. Headington. He was Vicar of Biloela from 1951 to 1954 after which he was the Chaplain of the University of New England.

Dean Rymer served as Padre of the Auckland Division of the RNZNVR from 1985 to 1993.

References

1924 births
Deans of Auckland
University of Queensland alumni
2003 deaths